Stone Temple Pilots is the seventh studio album, and the second self-titled studio album by American rock band Stone Temple Pilots, released on March 16, 2018, through Rhino. It is the band's first with lead singer Jeff Gutt, who joined the band in 2017.

The album is the band's first release since the deaths of original vocalist Scott Weiland and second vocalist Chester Bennington, both of whom are remembered in the liner notes.

The first single from the album, "Meadow", was released on November 15, 2017. A second single, "Roll Me Under", was released on January 31, 2018, to announce the album's release and the band's 2018 tour. A third single from the album, "The Art of Letting Go", was released on February 22, 2018, and a fourth single, "Never Enough", was released on March 8, 2018.

Critical reception

 

Stephen Thomas Erlewine of AllMusic gave a favorable review of the album, stating that it "shows they haven't lost their knack for hooky-heavy hard rock" and "certainly opens the door on another act in their career."

Track listing

Personnel
Stone Temple Pilots
 Jeff Gutt – lead vocals, backing vocals
 Dean DeLeo – guitar, production
 Robert DeLeo – bass, backing vocals, production
 Eric Kretz – drums, percussion

Production and design
 Stone Temple Pilots – production
 Ryan Williams – recording, engineering
 Russ Fowler – engineering 
 Ken Andrews – mixing
 Dave Cooley – mastering
 Hans Bruechle – cover art
 Michelle Shiers – photography

Charts

References

2018 albums
Rhino Records albums
Stone Temple Pilots albums